Matt Kennard may refer to:

 Matt Kennard (actor) (born 1982 in Grimsby, England, UK, as Matthew Kennard), English television actor
 Matt Kennard (journalist) (born 1983 in London, England, UK, as Matthew Kennard), English author and journalist

See also

 Kennard (surname)